The CONCACAF Caribbean Zone of 2002 FIFA World Cup qualification was contested between 24 CONCACAF members located in the Caribbean area.

The 24 teams were divided into 3 groups of 8 teams each. The teams would play in a knockout tournament, with matches on a home-and-away basis. The winners would advance to the Semi-final Round. The runners-up would advance to the Play-offs.

Group 1

First round

First leg

Second leg

Cuba won 4–0 on aggregate and advanced to the second round.

1–1 on aggregate. Suriname won 3–1 on penalties and advanced to the second round.

Aruba won 6–4 on aggregate and advanced to the second round.

Barbados won 5–4 on aggregate and advanced to the second round.

Second round

First leg

Second leg

Barbados won 7–1 on aggregate and advanced to the third round.

Cuba won 1–0 on aggregate and advanced to the third round.

Third round

First leg

Second leg

2–2 on aggregate. Barbados won 5–4 on penalties and advanced to the Central American round. Cuba advanced to the play-offs.

Group 2

First round
Guyana were suspended by FIFA, thus Antigua and Barbuda obtained a bye to the second round.

First leg

Second leg

Saint Vincent and the Grenadines won 14–1 on aggregate and advanced to the second round.

Saint Kitts and Nevis won 14–0 on aggregate and advanced to the second round.

Bermuda won 14–1 on aggregate and advanced to the second round.

Second round

First leg

Second leg

1–1 on aggregate. Antigua and Barbuda advanced to the third round on away goals.

Saint Vincent and the Grenadines won 3–1 on aggregate and advanced to the third round.

Third round

First leg

Second leg

Saint Vincent and the Grenadines won 5–2 on aggregate and advanced to the Central American round. Antigua and Barbuda advanced to the play-offs.

Group 3

First round

First leg

Second leg

Trinidad and Tobago won 6–1 on aggregate and advanced to the second round.

Dominican Republic won 6–1 on aggregate and advanced to the second round.

Haiti won 7–1 on aggregate and advanced to the second round.

Bahamas won 5–2 on aggregate and advanced to the second round.

Second round

First leg

Second leg

Haiti won 13–0 on aggregate and advanced to the third round.

Trinidad and Tobago won 4–0 on aggregate and advanced to the third round.

Third round

First leg

Second leg

Trinidad and Tobago won 4–2 on aggregate and advanced to the Central American round. Haiti advanced to the play-offs.

External links
FIFA official page
RSSSF - 2002 World Cup Qualification
Allworldcup

1
World Cup

de:Fußball-Weltmeisterschaft 2002/Qualifikation#CONCACAF Vorrunde
fr:Tours préliminaires à la Coupe du monde de football 2002#Caraïbes - Groupe 1
ko:2002년 FIFA 월드컵 북아메리카 지역 예선#카리브해
nl:Wereldkampioenschap voetbal 2002 (kwalificatie CONCACAF)#Caribische zone
pt:Eliminatórias da Copa do Mundo FIFA de 2002 - América do Norte, Central e Caribe#Zona Caribenha
ru:Чемпионат мира по футболу 2002 (отборочный турнир, КОНКАКАФ)#Карибская зона